Molotov Cocktail Party is the debut studio album by post-hardcore band Frodus, released in 1994 through Gnome Records, initially released exclusively on cassette format, limited to 1,000 blue copies. The album was reissued on digital formats in 2006.

Track listing

Personnel
Shelby Cinca -  Vocals, guitar, artwork
Jason Hamacher - Drums
Jim Cooper - Bass, Vocals
Charles Bennington - Saxophone
Steve Kille - Artwork
Don Zientara - Production, recording, mixing
Frodus - Music, mixing

References

1994 albums
Frodus albums